The A16, a motorway in north-central Switzerland, is a divided freeway connecting the border to France to the A5 motorway,  to the south on the Swiss plateau.

The A16 motorway is a long, winding corridor that crosses the Jura Mountains from the  Canton of Jura through part of the Bernese Jura area, to the flat part of the canton of  Berne on the Swiss plateau. Therefore, it is called Transjurane. It is congruent with the National Highway N16 and following its anticipated completion around 2020–2030, it will connect the French motorway network with the rest of the Swiss national road network. The extension provides for both four-lane standard (highway) and two-lane sections of "express roads" (Autostrasse). In 2014, there were approximately 71 km (84%) of roadway in operation, other sections were under construction or in planning.

Route Description  

 at Boncourt in the Ajoie at the border between Switzerland and France. It runs south across the Ajoie plateau to Porrentruy, where it veers to the east. It crosses the northern Jura chains in Saint-Ursanne through two long tunnels, and reaches Glovelier, on the plateau of Delémont. After bypassing that city, the A16 turns south again, and follows the course of the Birse via Moutier and Court until Tavannes. Upon crossing Col de Pierre Pertuis  through tunnels, the A16 follows the valley of the Suze (German:Schüss). It divides itself into a double lane road with separate downhill and uphill traffic on either side of the gorge of Taubenloch. It then reaches, the level of the Swiss plateau east of Biel/Bienne, connecting to the A5.

Status of construction 

The following sections are in operation:
 Biel (Bözingenfeld) - La Heutte: Applies from entering Biel-North officially as a third-class national highway, because the section also supports bicycles and tractors. In each direction two lanes are almost continuously present. The running carriageway is separated, one on the west, the other on the eastern valley slope, the latter being largely the main track in use since 1965.
 La Heutte - Tavannes: route with standard highway, opened November 1997.
 Delémont - Porrentruy: Narrow highway with emergency stopping bays but without paved emergency lane; the tunnels of Mont Terri and Mont Russelin have one lane in each direction. The opening of the route took place in November 1998, with bypasses of Delémont and Porrentruy (each with standard highway) in September 2005.
 Moutier-North opened up to Choindez (Canton boundary BE / JU), November 2007.
 Court - Moutier-Nord: Motorway standard section  Moutier-Sud to Moutier-Nord opened in November 2011. Mostly one lane in each direction remainder opened in November 2013.
 Porrentruy-Ouest - Bure:  One lane each direction will be created initially; four-lane opened August 2014.
 Bure - Boncourt: Opened November 2011.
 Tavannes - Loveresse: The two-lane stretch opened November 2012.
 Loveresse - Court: With a 4.5 km stretch of standard highway, opened in April 2017.
 District boundary BE / JU - Delémont-Est: This two-lane section was initially scheduled to open in 2016.

Because of the current financial constraints, the Swiss Federal Government can postpone most of the works on new sections. The connection of the A16 to the A36 motorway in France (Mulhouse - Dijon) between Montbéliard and Belfort is to be completed within a time horizon of 2025–2030.

Costs  
Along its course, the A16 has many engineering structures, mainly tunnels but also some bridges. Therefore, the A16 is one of the most expensive road projects in Switzerland. For the whole line, a total cost of 5.6 billion Swiss francs is estimated.

Tunnels 
Because of the difficult terrain in the area of the Jura Mountains, the construction of numerous tunnels was necessary to pass underneath the various Jura chains.

Tunnel de Bure
Tunnel du Banné (Bypass Porrentruy)
Tunnel de la Perche (Bypass Porrentruy)
Tunnel du Mont Terri
Tunnel du Mont Russelin
Tunnel de Choindez (Bypass Schlucht von Choindez)
Tunnel du Raimeux (Bypass der Gorges de Moutier)
Tunnel de Moutier (Bypass Moutier)
Tunnel de Graitery (Bypass Schlucht von Court)
Tunnel Sous le Mont (Bypass Tavannes)
Tunnel de Pierre Pertuis

Some tunnels have been built to protect the residents of nearby villages and hamlets from the noise emissions.

History  
The A16 was not one from the start to the national motorway network in Switzerland, although there were initial projects of Jura rapid-traverse between Biel and Belfort, as early as 1964. The inclusion of the A16 in the plan of the national road network came in 1984, after the population had approved construction in the Canton of Jura, with a large majority (71%). The highway should be the favored new project of the Jura and the Ajoie. The efficient transport corridor is to ensure, after completion, a much faster connection to the rest of Switzerland. Flora Ruchat-Roncati and Renato Salvi of ETH Zurich won the competition to design the highway in 1988.

Even after entering the national motorway network, there was the part of environmentalists strong opposition to the project. In the context of the so-called Clover Initiative, the construction of the A16 should be submitted to the entire Swiss population to vote. Due to the high acceptance of the project in the affected regions, the request was withdrawn before a vote on other controversial motorway cuts (in April 1990).

Paleontology 

During the construction work on the A16, in the vicinity of Courtedoux, workers found a slab with about 500 footprints of dinosaurs,  which used to live in the area about 150 million years ago.

Junction list

Notes

References 

 "Die Schweizer Autobahnen", Autobahnen.ch, 2009, web: Autobahnen.ch (with sub-webpage for A16).
 More sources in "Motorways of Switzerland".

External links 

Official Website (French)
Ausgrabung von Saurierfährten (with photos)
Photo-series: A16 on Autobahnen.ch

A16
Transport in the canton of Jura
Transport in the canton of Bern